Reshnagri is a village located in Shopian district of Indian union territory of Jammu and Kashmir. Reshnagri is the combination of two Sanskrit words "Resh" (priest) and "nagri" (land) which means the land of priests. Its headquarters are located in Shopian which is 10 km away from the village. Reshnagri is situated on the banks of Veshaw River which comes under south-western part of Kashmir Valley.  The village is divided into five parts,   Darul Rehmat, Darul Barkaat, Darul Salaam, Darul Anwaar, Darul Fazl. Majority of the population  is Ahmadiyya Muslim, A big New Ahmadiyya   jamia masjid is being constructed .The Ahmadiyya Muslim Community are Muslims who believe in the Messiah, Mirza Ghulam Ahmad (peace be on him) (1835-1908) of Qadian. Mirza Ghulam Ahmad founded the Ahmadiyya Muslim Community in 1889 as a revival movement within Islam, emphasizing its essential teachings of peace, love, justice, and sanctity of life. Today, the Ahmadiyya Muslim Community is the world’s largest Islamic community under one Divinely appointed leader, His Holiness, Mirza Masroor Ahmad (may Allah be his Helper) (b. 1950). The Ahmadiyya Muslim Community spans over 200 nations with membership exceeding tens of millions

Demographics
As per the census of India 2011, the Reshnagri is the home of 558 householders which further extends to 3036 individuals, of which 1554 are males while 1482 are females. The total geographical area of Reshnagri is 515.6 hectares and it is the 5th biggest village by area in Shopian district.

References 

Villages in Shopian district